Valentinos Sielis (born 1 March 1990) is a Cypriot professional footballer who plays as a centre back for Busan IPark. In 2014, he signed with AEL. Sielis is a Cypriot international and made his debut on 9 February 2011, against Romania in the CytaVision Cyprus Tournament 2011.

He was awarded the best youth player in Cyprus in May 2012.

Early life

Sielis was born in Paphos, a town in Cyprus. He is the second born of three siblings. Valentinos has two brothers, also footballers. The eldest, Giorgos, plays for AEK Kouklia, and the youngest, Christos, plays for Levski Sofia.

Club career

Early career
Sielis began his career in England first in Arsenal F.C. U12, Tottenham F.C U13, the first professional team for Doncaster Rovers, Sielis signed with local club of Enosis Neon Thoi Lakatamia FC, and after a great season he moved to Anorthosis Famagusta. In 2014, he moved to AEL, where he has played consistently well since joining.

Anorthosis Famagusta
Sielis joined Anorthosis at 15 June 2009 from Enosis Neon Thoi Lakatamia FC as a free agent.

Sielis made his team debut as 30th-minute substitute in a 0–3 away victory over Othellos Athienou F.C. for Cypriot Cup on 23 September 2009. he play as a first time in a European competition on the starting squad in a 1–2 home defeat from CSKA Moscow in Antonis Papadopoulos Stadium for the UEFA Europa League 4th qualifying round. He made his debut at the 72nd minute in Cypus first division in a 2–1 home victory over Olympiakos Nicosia. At the end of the season he played for 18 matches, 10 of them as a substitution, with 875 minutes of total playing time. On 8 May 2011, Sielis played for a first time in a Derby on the basic squad in a 1–0 away defeat from Omonia Nicosia. For the season 2011–12, during the period with coach Stanimir Stoilov, Sielis was a basic player of Anorthosis in the European competitions with 3 appearances in 4 matches, all as a substitution. After the arrival of Ronny Levy, Sielis played 4 times, once on the basic squad against Olympiakos Nicosia. For the season 2012–13, Sielis, Began the season as the second left back of the team. After the announcement that William Boaventura end his career, Sielis became the main left back for the team. From 8th until 19th match day Sielis starts all the matches in the basic line-up. In March 2013, Sielis had a serious injury and he underwent surgery. As a result, the team lost all the other matches until the end of the season.

Outside football

Volunteering
Valentinos Sielis is particularly sensitive to issues related to helping our fellowmen. It is amazing that in the transmission of reckoning AEL Limassol – Anorthosis from CytaVision, Savvas Kosiaris, some time before the incident with Kaluđerović said that Sielis was a compatible bone marrow transplant donor and his altruism helped a fellow human to stay alive.

Heroic act – Kaluđerović serious injury
At 26 April 2014, the striker of AEL Limassol, Andrija Kaluđerović claimed the ball with Paulo Jorge and seemed to hit the head of his opponent, with Kaluđerović to fall to the ground unconscious. The broadcaster of Cytavision who was at the soccer ground, said that Kaluđerović swallowed his tongue and Sielis of Anorthosis had brought him back, when the Cypriot swiftly gave him first aid.

Career statistics
As of 3 March 2016

International goals
Scores and results list Cyprus' goal tally first.

International career
Sielis was the captain of Cyprus national team under 21, with 8 appearances and 2 goals. On 3 September 2010 Sielis scored his first goal with the national team under 21 in an away victory 1–3 over Norway under-21 football team.

On 26 March 2010, Sielis made his debut with the national team of Cyprus in the home draw 0–0 against Iceland. In 2012–13, Sielis played in 2 of national team matches, in a home victory 1–0 against Iceland, and in away defeat 2–1 from Slovenia.

Honours

Individual
Best player of the year in Cyprus
Best youth Footballer: 2012

References

External links
 
 Valentinos Sielis at anorthosisfc.com
 Profile at uefa.com
 
 

1990 births
Living people
Cypriot footballers
Association football defenders
Cyprus international footballers
Cypriot First Division players
Cypriot expatriate footballers
Anorthosis Famagusta F.C. players
ENTHOI Lakatamia FC players
AEL Limassol players
People from Paphos
Gangwon FC players
K League 1 players
Expatriate footballers in South Korea
Cypriot expatriate sportspeople in South Korea